Samir Khader is the Head of Programs and Current Affairs at Sky News Arabia, after having been the Program Editor & Head of Output of Qatar-based broadcaster Al Jazeera. He comes from  Jordan. He has degrees in journalism and mathematics from universities in Grenoble and Paris. Samir Khader began his career as a TV journalist in 1979 on French television.  He worked for many years in Jordan as a journalist in television news before joining Al Jazeera and then Sky News Arabia in Abu Dhabi. He is well known for being featured in the documentary film Control Room, when he was a senior producer.

Quotes
"Between us, if I am offered a job with FOX NEWS, I would take it - to change the arab nightmare into the American dream....I still have that dream."

-Control Room, interview with Samir Khader

References

External links
Counter Currents - Al-Jazeera: Holding The Head High interview with Samir Khader, February 7, 2006
CBC News - Passionate Eye Showcase: Control Room program on the making of the documentary film, September 26, 2004
IPA - Voices That Must Be Heard - Inside Al Jazeera: A Conversation with Samir Khader interview July 1, 2004 issue
In These Times - Inside Al-Jazeera interview June 18, 2004
Philadelphia City Paper - The View From Here interview June 18, 2004
LA Weekly - Meeting Al-Jazeera extensive interview June 4, 2004
 Pacifica Radio report and audio
Democracy Now! - Massacre in Fallujah: Over 600 Dead, 1,000 Injured, 60,000 Refugees April 12, 2004 with transcript, audio and video

 "Inside Al Jazeera" interview by Mridu Chandra and Rehan Ansari The Brooklyn Rail (June 2004)

Iraqi journalists
Al Jazeera people
Living people
Year of birth missing (living people)